Lower Daintree is a coastal locality in the Shire of Douglas, Queensland, Australia.

Geography
The Daintree River forms the northern boundary, and the Coral Sea the eastern.

Road infrastructure
The Mossman Daintree Road runs through from south to north-west.

References 

Shire of Douglas
Coastline of Queensland
Localities in Queensland